The Second term of Tung Chee-hwa as Chief Executive of Hong Kong, or Tung administration, officially considered part of "The 2nd term Chief Executive of Hong Kong", relates to the period of governance of Hong Kong since the transfer of sovereignty of Hong Kong, between 1 July 2002 and 12 March 2005 until Tung Chee-hwa resigned from the office and the rest of the term was taken up by former Chief Secretary for Administration Donald Tsang.

Election

Incumbent Tung Chee-hwa was nominated by the 800-member Election Committee (EC) without contest despite his declining popularity. The pro-democracy camp argued that the electoral process was deliberately designed to obstruct any challenge to Tung.

Cabinet
Under the Principal Officials Accountability System introduced by Tung Chee-hwa in July 2002, there were 3 Secretaries of Department and 11 Directors of Bureau. Under the new system, all heads of bureaux became members of the Executive Council, and came directly under the Chief Executive instead of the Chief Secretary or the Financial Secretary.

Ministry
Two major officials under serve criticisms resigned during the political crisis in July 2003: Financial Secretary Antony Leung resigned in July after the "Lexusgate" scandal and Secretary for Security Regina Ip after the controversial Hong Kong Basic Law Article 23 legislation.

|}

Executive Council non-official members
The Executive Council was headed by Chief Executive and with total of 19 members: 3 secretaries and 11 directors of the bureaux as official members and 5 non-official members. All non-official members except for Convenor Leung Chun-ying was newly appointed by Tung Chee-hwa.

Tung allied himself with the Democratic Alliance for the Betterment of Hong Kong (DAB) and the Liberal Party, by appointing chairmen of the Liberal Party and DAB, James Tien and Jasper Tsang Yok-sing to the Executive Council to form a "ruling alliance."

On 5 July 2003, James Tien resigned from the ExCo to show objection to the legislation of Hong Kong Basic Law Article 23, after more than 500,000 people marched on 1 July. Tung later on appointed Selina Chow, also from the Liberal Party to replace Tien.

In October 2004, Tung appointed two additional non-official members to the Executive Council.

See also
 First term of Tung Chee-hwa as Chief Executive of Hong Kong
 First term of Donald Tsang as Chief Executive of Hong Kong

References

Hong Kong Government